Kei Miller  (born 24 October 1978) is a Jamaican poet, fiction writer, essayist and blogger. He is also a professor of creative writing.

Early life and education 
Kei Miller was born and raised in Kingston, Jamaica. He read English at the University of the West Indies, but dropped out short of graduation. However, while studying there, he befriended Mervyn Morris, who encouraged his writing. Afterwards, Miller began publishing widely throughout the Caribbean.

In 2004, he left for England to study for an MA in Creative Writing (The Novel) at Manchester Metropolitan University under the tutelage of poet and scholar Michael Schmidt. Miller later completed a PhD in English Literature at the University of Glasgow.

Career
In 2006, Miller's first book of poetry was released, Kingdom of Empty Bellies (Heaventree Press). It was shortly followed by a collection of short stories, The Fear of Stones, which partly explores issues of Jamaican homophobia. The collection was shortlisted in 2007 for a Commonwealth Writers' Prize in the category of Best First Book (Canada or Caribbean). His second collection of poetry, There Is an Anger That Moves, was published in 2007 by Carcanet Press. He is also the editor of Carcanet's 2007 New Caribbean Poetry: An Anthology. His first novel, The Same Earth, was published in 2008, followed in 2010 by The Last Warner Woman. That same year saw the publication of his poetry collection A Light Song of Light. In 2013 his Writing Down the Vision: Essays & Prophecies was published, and in 2014 a collection of poems for which he was awarded the Forward Prize, The Cartographer Tries to Map a Way to Zion. Hilary Mantel chose The Cartographer Tries to Map a Way to Zion as one of her favourite books of 2014. This compilation includes a poem on unusual Jamaican place-names, such as Me-no-Sen-You-no-Come. He published a collection of essays titled Things I Have Withheld in 2021, which was shortlisted for the Baillie Gifford Prize for Nonfiction.

In 2014, Miller was named as one of the 20 "Next Generation Poets", a list compiled every ten years by the Poetry Book Society.

He was an International Writing Fellow at the University of Iowa, and has also been a visiting writer at York University in Canada, at the Department of Library Services in the British Virgin Islands and a Vera Rubin Fellow at Yaddo. He currently divides his time between Jamaica and the United Kingdom. Until 2014, he was Reader at the University of Glasgow. He is currently Professor of Creative Writing at the University of Exeter. 

Miller's third novel, Augustown, won the 2017 OCM Bocas Prize for Caribbean Literature.

Miller was awarded the 2018 Anthony N Sabga Caribbean Award for Excellence in Arts & Letters.

In June 2018, Miller was elected Fellow of the Royal Society of Literature in its "40 Under 40" initiative.

Miller was a judge for the 2020 Griffin Poetry Prize.

Awards and honours
2007: International Writer's Fellowship at the University of Iowa
2009: Silver Musgrave Medal from the Institute of Jamaica
2010: Shortlisted for the John Llewellyn Rhys Prize, A Light Song of Light
2013: Rex Nettleford Fellow in Cultural Studies
2013: Shortlisted for the Phillis Wheatley Book Award in Fiction, The Last Warner Woman
2014: Named as one of the Next Generation Poets
2014: OCM Bocas Prize for Caribbean Literature (Non-fiction), Writing Down the Vision
2014: Shortlisted for the international Dylan Thomas Prize, The Cartographer Tries to Map A Way to Zion
2014: Winner of the Forward Prize for Poetry, The Cartographer Tries to Map A Way to Zion
2017: Winner of the OCM Bocas Prize for Caribbean Literature for Augustown
2017: Winner of the Prix Carbet de la Caraïbe et du Tout-Monde for By The Rivers of Babylon (French Translation of Augustown)
2018: Winner of an Anthony N Sabga Caribbean Award for Excellence (Arts & Letters)
2018: Elected a Fellow of the Royal Society of Literature
2018: Winner of the Prix Les Afriques for By The Rivers of Babylon (French Translation of Augustown)
2021: Shortlisted for the Baillie Gifford Prize for Nonfiction for Things I Have Withheld
2022: Shortlisted for the Jhalak Prize for Things I Have Withheld

Selected works 
Fear of Stones and Other Stories (short stories), Macmillan Caribbean, 2006, .
Kingdom of Empty Bellies (poems), Heaventree Press, 2006, .
 There Is an Anger That Moves, Carcanet Press, 2007, .
The Same Earth (novel), Weidenfeld & Nicolson, 2008, ; Phoenix, 2009, .
The Last Warner Woman (novel), Weidenfeld & Nicolson, 2010, ; Phoenix, 2011, .
A Light Song of Light (poems), Carcanet Press, 2010, .
Writing Down the Vision: Essays & Prophecies, Peepal Tree Press, 2013, .
The Cartographer Tries to Map a Way to Zion (poems), Carcanet, 2014, .
Augustown (novel), Weidenfeld & Nicolson, 2016, 
Things I Have Withheld (essays), Canongate Books Ltd, 2021, ISBN 978-1838852795

As editor
New Caribbean Poetry: An Anthology, Carcanet Press, 2007, .

References

External links 
Kei Miller Author Profile at Carcanet Press
Kei Miller at The Poetry Archive.
Kei Miller, "When love turns to hate: The darkness that lurks beyond the tourist compounds of the Caribbean", The Glasgow Herald, 2 August 2008.
Nicholas Laughlin, "The distraction of Walcott vs Naipaul", The Guardian, 5 June 2008. An article mentioning Miller as strong performer of his work.
 "Interview with Kei Miller", Iota, No. 83 & 84, Spring 2009, pp. 67–70.
 Annie Paull, "Kei Miller Maps His Way to Zion…" (interview), 16 October 2014.
 Laura Miller, Augustown': A Novel of the Sacred and the Profane in Jamaica", The New Yorker, 22 May 2017.
 Erin MacLeod, That Story Keeps on Repeating Itself': An Interview with Kei Miller", Hazlitt, 4 October 2017.

1978 births
Living people
21st-century Jamaican novelists
21st-century Jamaican poets
21st-century male writers
Alumni of Manchester Metropolitan University
Alumni of the University of Glasgow
Anthologists
Fellows of the Royal Society of Literature
International Writing Program alumni
Jamaican male novelists
Jamaican male poets
People from Kingston, Jamaica
Recipients of the Musgrave Medal
University of the West Indies alumni